Iñupiaq or Inupiaq, also known as Iñupiat, Inupiat, Iñupiatun or Alaskan Inuit, is an Inuit language, or perhaps group of languages, spoken by the Iñupiat people in northern and northwestern Alaska, as well as a small adjacent part of the Northwest Territories of Canada. The Iñupiat language is a member of the Inuit-Yupik-Unangan language family, and is closely related to, but not mutually intelligible with, other Inuit languages of Canada and Greenland. There are roughly 2,000 speakers.  Iñupiaq is considered to be a threatened language, with most speakers at or above the age of 40. Iñupiaq is an official language of the State of Alaska, along with several other indigenous languages.

The major varieties of the Iñupiaq language are the North Slope Iñupiaq and Seward Peninsula Iñupiaq dialects.

The Iñupiaq language has been in decline since contact with English in the late 19th century. American territorial acquisition and the legacy of boarding schools have created a situation today where a small minority of Iñupiat speak the Iñupiaq language. There is, however, revitalization work underway today in several communities.

History 
The Iñupiaq language is an Inuit language, the ancestors of which may have been spoken in the northern regions of Alaska for as long as 5,000 years. Between 1,000 and 800 years ago, Inuit migrated east from Alaska to Canada and Greenland, eventually occupying the entire Arctic coast and much of the surrounding inland areas. The Iñupiaq dialects are the most conservative forms of the Inuit language, with less linguistic change than the other Inuit languages.

In the mid to late 19th century, Russian, British, and American colonists made contact with Iñupiat people. In 1885, the American territorial government appointed Rev. Sheldon Jackson as General Agent of Education. Under his administration, Iñupiat people (and all Alaska Natives) were educated in English-only environments, forbidding the use of Iñupiaq and other indigenous languages of Alaska. After decades of English-only education, with strict punishment if heard speaking Iñupiaq, after the 1970s, most Iñupiat did not pass the Iñupiaq language on to their children, for fear of them being punished for speaking their language.

In 1972, the Alaska Legislature passed legislation mandating that if "a [school is attended] by at least 15 pupils whose primary language is other than English, [then the school] shall have at least one teacher who is fluent in the native language".

Today, the University of Alaska Fairbanks offers bachelor's degrees in Iñupiaq language and culture, while a preschool/kindergarten-level Iñupiaq immersion school named Nikaitchuat Ilisaġviat teaches grades PreK-1st grade in Kotzebue.

In 2014, Iñupiaq became an official language of the State of Alaska, alongside English and nineteen other indigenous languages.

In 2018, Facebook added Iñupiaq as a language option on their website. In 2022, an Iñupiaq version of Wordle was created.

Dialects
There are four main dialect divisions and these can be organized within two larger dialect collections:
Seward Peninsula Iñupiaq is spoken on the Seward Peninsula. It has a possible Yupik substrate and is divergent from other Inuit languages.
Qawiaraq
Bering Strait
Northern Alaskan Iñupiaq is spoken from the Northwest Arctic and North Slope regions of Alaska to the Mackenzie Delta in Northwest Territories, Canada.  
Malimiut
North Slope Iñupiaq

Extra geographical information:

Bering Strait dialect:

The Native population of the Big Diomede Island was moved to the Siberian mainland after World War II. The following generation of the population spoke Central Siberian Yupik or Russian. The entire population of King Island moved to Nome in the early 1960s. The Bering Strait dialect might also be spoken in Teller on the Seward Peninsula.

Qawiaraq dialect:

A dialect of Qawiaraq is spoken in Nome. A dialect of Qawariaq may also be spoken in Koyuk, Mary's Igloo, Council, and Elim. The Teller sub-dialect may be spoken in Unalakleet.

Malimiutun dialect:

Both sub-dialects can be found in Buckland, Koyuk, Shaktoolik, and Unalakleet. A dialect of Malimiutun may be spoken in Deering, Kiana, Noorvik, Shungnak, and Ambler. The Malimiutun sub-dialects have also been classified as "Southern Malimiut" (found in Koyuk, Shaktoolik, and Unalakleet) and "Northern Malimiut" found in "other villages".

North Slope dialect:

Common North Slope is "a mix of the various speech forms formerly used in the area". The Point Barrow dialect was "spoken only by a few elders" in 2010. A dialect of North Slope is also spoken in Kivalina, Point Lay, Wainwright, Atqasuk, Utqiaġvik, Nuiqsut, and Barter Island.

Phonology
Iñupiaq dialects differ widely between consonants used. However, consonant clusters of more than two consonants in a row do not occur. A word may not begin nor end with a consonant cluster.

All Iñupiaq dialects have three basic vowel qualities: /a i u/. There is currently no instrumental work to determine what allophones may be linked to these vowels. All three vowels can be long or short, giving rise to a system of six phonemic vowels /a aː i iː u uː/. Long vowels are represented by double letters in the orthography: ⟨aa⟩, ⟨ii⟩, ⟨uu⟩. The following diphthongs occur: /ai ia au ua iu ui/. No more than two vowels occur in a sequence in Iñupiaq.

The Bering strait dialect has a fourth vowel /e/, which preserves the fourth proto-Eskimo vowel reconstructed as */ə/. In the other dialects, proto-Eskimo */e/ has merged with the closed front vowel /i/. The merged /i/ is referred to as the “strong /i/”, which causes palatalization when preceding consonant clusters in the North Slope dialect (see section on palatalization below). The other /i/ is referred to as “the weak /i/”. Weak and strong /i/s are not differentiated in orthography, making it impossible to tell which ⟨i⟩ represents palatalization “short of looking at other processes which depend on the distinction between two i's or else examining data from other Eskimo languages”. However, it can be assumed that, within a word, if a palatal consonant is preceded by an ⟨i⟩, it is strong. If an alveolar consonant is preceded by an ⟨i⟩, it is weak.

Words begin with a stop (with the exception of the palatal stop /c/), the fricative /s/, nasals /m n/, with a vowel, or the semivowel /j/. Loanwords, proper names, and exclamations may begin with any segment in both the Seward Peninsula dialects and the North Slope dialects. In the Uummarmiutun dialect words can also begin with /h/. For example, the word for "ear" in North Slope and Little Diomede Island dialects is siun whereas in Uummarmiutun it is hiun.

A word may end in any nasal sound (except for the /ɴ/ found in North Slope), in the stops /t k q/ or in a vowel. In the North Slope dialect if a word ends with an m, and the next word begins with a stop, the m is pronounced /p/, as in aġnam tupiŋa, pronounced /aʁnap tupiŋa/

Very little information of the prosody of Iñupiaq has been collected. However, "fundamental frequency (Hz), intensity (dB), loudness (sones), and spectral tilt (phons - dB) may be important" in Malimiutun. Likewise, "duration is not likely to be important in Malimiut Iñupiaq stress/syllable prominence".

North Slope Iñupiaq 
For North Slope Iñupiaq

The voiceless stops /p/ /t/ /k/ and /q/ are not aspirated. This may or may not be true for other dialects as well.

/c/ is derived from a palatalized and unreleased /t/.

Assimilation 
Two consonants cannot appear together unless they share the manner of articulation (in this case treating the lateral and approximant consonants as fricatives). The only exception to this rule is having a voiced fricative consonant appear with a nasal consonant. Since all stops in North Slope are voiceless, a lot of needed assimilation arises from having to assimilate a voiceless stop to a voiced consonant.

This process is realized by assimilating the first consonant in the cluster to a consonant that: 1) has the same (or closest possible) area of articulation as the consonant being assimilated to; and 2) has the same manner of articulation as the second consonant that it is assimilating to. If the second consonant is a lateral or approximant, the first consonant will assimilate to a lateral or approximant if possible. If not the first consonant will assimilate to a fricative. Therefore:

 * The sound /ɴ/ is not represented in the orthography. Therefore the spelling ġn can be pronounced as /ʁn/ or /ɴn/. In both examples 1 and 2, since voiced fricatives can appear with nasal consonants, both consonant clusters are possible.

The stops /t̚ʲ/ and /t/ do not have a corresponding voiced fricative, therefore they will assimilate to the closest possible area of articulation. In this case, the /t̚ʲ/ will assimilate to the voiced approximant /j/. Therefore:

(In the first example above note that <sr> denotes a single consonant, as shown in the alphabet section below, so the constraint of at most two consonants in a cluster, as mentioned above, is not violated.)

In the case of the second consonant being a lateral, the lateral will again be treated as a fricative. Therefore:

Since voiced fricatives can appear with nasal consonants, both consonant clusters are possible.

Therefore, like the /ɴn/ example shown above, assimilation still occurs while the spelling remains the same. Therefore:

These general features of assimilation are not shared with Uummarmiut, Malimiutun, or the Seward Peninsula dialects. Malimiutun and the Seward Peninsula dialects "preserve  voiceless stops (k, p, q, t) when they are etymological (i.e. when they belong to the original word-base)".  Compare:

Palatalization 
The following patterns of palatalization can occur in North Slope Iñupiaq: /t/ → /t̚ʲ/,   or /s/;   → ;  → ; and /n/ → . Palatalization only occurs when one of these four alveolars is preceded by a strong i. Compare:

 Please note that the sound /t̚ʲ/ does not have its own letter, and is simply spelled with a T t. The IPA transcription of the above vowels may be incorrect.

If a t that precedes a vowel is palatalized, it will become an /s/. The strong i affects the entire consonant cluster, palatalizing all consonants that can be palatalized within the cluster. Therefore:

 Note in the first example, due to the nature of the suffix, the /q/ is dropped. Like the first set of examples, the IPA transcriptions of above vowels may be incorrect.

If a strong i precedes geminate consonant, the entire elongated consonant becomes palatalized. For Example: niġḷḷaturuq and tikiññiaqtuq.

Further strong versus weak i processes 
The strong i can be paired with a vowel. The weak i on the other hand cannot. The weak i will become an a if it is paired with another vowel, or if the consonant before the i becomes geminate. This rule may or may not apply to other dialects. Therefore:

Like the first two sets of examples, the IPA transcriptions of above vowels may not be correct.

Uummarmiutun sub-dialect 
For the Uummarmiutun sub-dialect:

Phonological rules 
The following are the phonological rules:
The /f/ is always found as a geminate.

The /j/ cannot be geminated, and is always found between vowels or preceded by /v/. In rare cases it can be found at the beginning of a word.

The /h/ is never geminate, and can appear as the first letter of the word, between vowels, or preceded by /k/ /ɬ/ or /q/.

Seward Peninsula Iñupiaq 
For Seward Peninsula Iñupiaq:

Unlike the other Iñupiaq dialects, the Seward Peninsula dialect has a mid central vowel e (see the beginning of the phonology section for more information).

Gemination 
Gemination is caused by suffixes being added to a consonant, so that the consonant is found between two vowels.

Writing systems

Iñupiaq was first written when explorers first arrived in Alaska and began recording words in the native languages.  They wrote by adapting the letters of their own language to writing the sounds they were recording.  Spelling was often inconsistent, since the writers invented it as they wrote.  Unfamiliar sounds were often confused with other sounds, so that, for example, 'q' was often not distinguished from 'k' and long consonants or vowels were not distinguished from short ones.

Along with the Alaskan and Siberian Yupik, the Iñupiat eventually adopted the Latin script (Qaliujaaqpait) that Moravian missionaries developed in Greenland and Labrador. Native Alaskans also developed a system of pictographs, which, however, died with its creators.

In 1946, Roy Ahmaogak, an Iñupiaq Presbyterian minister from Utqiaġvik, worked with Eugene Nida, a member of the Summer Institute of Linguistics, to develop the current Iñupiaq alphabet based on the Latin script.  Although some changes have been made since its origin—most notably the change from 'ḳ' to 'q'—the essential system was accurate and is still in use.

Extra letter for Kobuk dialect:  ʼ 

Extra letters for specific dialects:
Diomede: e  
Qawiaraq: ch  //

Morphosyntax
Due to the number of dialects and complexity of Iñupiaq morphosyntax, the following section discusses Malimiutun morphosyntax as a representative. Any examples from other dialects will be marked as such.

Iñupiaq is a polysynthetic language, meaning that words can be extremely long, consisting of one of three stems (verb stem, noun stem, and demonstrative stem) along with one or more of three endings (postbases, (grammatical) endings, and enclitics). The stem gives meaning to the word, whereas endings give information regarding case, mood, tense, person, plurality, etc. The stem can appear as simple (having no postbases) or complex (having one or more postbases). In Iñupiaq a "postbase serves somewhat the same functions that adverbs, adjectives, prefixes, and suffixes do in English" along with marking various types of tenses. There are six word classes in Malimiut Inñupiaq: nouns (see Nominal Morphology), verbs (see Verbal Morphology), adverbs, pronouns, conjunctions, and interjections. All demonstratives are classified as either adverbs or pronouns.

Nominal morphology 
The Iñupiaq category of number distinguishes singular, dual, and plural. The language works on an Ergative-Absolutive system, where nouns are inflected for number, several cases, and possession. Iñupiaq (Malimiutun) has nine cases, two core cases (ergative and absolutive) and seven oblique cases (instrumental, allative, ablative, locative, perlative, similative and vocative). North Slope Iñupiaq does not have the vocative case. Iñupiaq does not have a category of gender and articles.

Iñupiaq nouns can likewise be classified by Wolf A. Seiler's seven noun classes. These noun classes are "based on morphological behavior. [They] ... have no semantic basis but are useful for case formation ... stems of various classes interact with suffixes differently".

Due to the nature of the morphology, a single case can take on up to 12 endings (ignoring the fact that realization of these endings can change depending on noun class). For example, the possessed ergative ending for a class 1a noun can take on the endings: -ma, mnuk, pta, vich, ptik, -psi, -mi, -mik, -miŋ, -ŋan, -ŋaknik, and ŋata. Therefore, only general features will be described below. For an extensive list on case endings, please see Seiler 2012, Appendix 4, 6, and 7.

Absolutive case/noun stems 
The subject of an intransitive sentence or the object of a transitive sentence take on the absolutive case. This case is likewise used to mark the basic form of a noun. Therefore, all the singular, dual, and plural absolutive forms serve as stems for the other oblique cases. The following chart is verified of both Malimiutun and North Slope Iñupiaq. 

If the singular absolutive form ends with -n, it has the underlying form of -ti /tə/. This form will show in the absolutive dual and plural forms. Therefore:

Regarding nouns that have an underlying /ə/ (weak i), the i will change to an a and the previous consonant will be geminated in the dual form. Therefore:

If the singular form of the noun ends with -k, the preceding vowel will be elongated. Therefore:

On occasion, the consonant preceding the final vowel is also geminated, though exact phonological reasoning is unclear.

Ergative case 
The ergative case is often referred to as the Relative Case in Iñupiaq sources. This case marks the subject of a transitive sentence or a genitive (possessive) noun phrase. For non-possessed noun phrases, the noun is marked only if it is a third person singular. The unmarked nouns leave ambiguity as to who/what is the subject and object. This can be resolved only through context. Possessed noun phrases and noun phrases expressing genitive are marked in ergative for all persons.

This suffix applies to all singular unpossessed nouns in the ergative case.

Please note the underlying /tə/ form in the first example.

Instrumental case 
This case is also referred to as the modalis case. This case has a wide range of uses described below:

Since the ending is the same for both dual and plural, different stems are used. In all the examples the k is assimilated to an ŋ.

Allative case 
The allative case is also referred to as the terminalis case. The uses of this case are described below:

*It is unclear as to whether this example is regular for the dual form or not.

Numerals 

Iñupiaq numerals are base-20 with a sub-base of 5. The numbers 1 to 20 are:

The sub-base of five shows in the words for 5, tallimat, and 15, akimiaq, to which the numbers 1 to 3 are added to create the words for 7, 8, 16, 17 and 18, etc. (itchaksrat '6' being irregular). Apart from sisamat '4', numbers before a multiple of five are indicated with the subtractive element -utaiḷaq: quliŋŋuġutaiḷaq '9' from qulit '10', akimiaġutaiḷaq '14' from akimiaq '15', iñuiññaġutaiḷaq '19' from iñuiññaq '20'.

Scores are created with the element -kipiaq, and numbers between the scores are composed by adding 1 through 19 to these. Multiples of 400 are created with -agliaq and 8000's with -pak. Note that these words will vary between singular -q and plural -t, depending on the speaker and whether they are being used for counting or for modifying a noun.

The system continues through compounding suffixes to a maximum of iñuiññagliaqpakpiŋatchaq (20×400×80003, ≈ 4 quadrillion), e.g.

There is also a decimal system for the hundreds and thousands, with the numerals qavluun for 100 and kavluutit for 1000, thus malġuk qavluun 200, malġuk kavluutit 2000, etc.

Etymology
The numeral five, tallimat, is derived from the word for hand/arm. The word for 10, qulit, is derived from the word for "top", meaning the ten digits on the top part of the body. The numeral for 15, akimiaq, means something like "it goes across", and the numeral for 20, iñuiññaq means something like "entire person" or "complete person", indicating the 20 digits of all extremities.

Verbal morphology 
Again, Malimiutun Iñupiaq is used as a representative example in this section. The basic structure of the verb is [(verb) + (derivational suffix) + (inflectional suffix) + (enclitic)], although Lanz (2010) argues that this approach is insufficient since it "forces one to analyze ... optional ... suffixes". Every verb has an obligatory inflection for person, number, and mood (all marked by a single suffix), and can have other inflectional suffixes such as tense, aspect, modality, and various suffixes carrying adverbial functions.

Tense 
Tense marking is always optional. The only explicitly marked tense is the future tense. Past and present tense cannot be marked and are always implied. All verbs can be marked through adverbs to show relative time (using words such as "yesterday" or "tomorrow"). If neither of these markings is present, the verb can imply a past, present, or future tense.

Aspect 
Marking aspect is optional in Iñupiaq verbs. Both North Slope and Malimiut Iñupiaq have a perfective versus imperfective distinction in aspect, along with other distinctions such as: frequentative (-ataq; "to repeatedly verb"), habitual (-suu; "to always, habitually verb"), inchoative (-łhiñaaq; "about to verb"), and intentional (-saġuma; "intend to verb"). The aspect suffix can be found after the verb root and before or within the obligatory person-number-mood suffix.

Mood 
Iñupiaq has the following moods: Indicative, Interrogative, Imperative (positive, negative), Coordinative, and Conditional. Participles are sometimes classified as a mood. 

Indicative mood endings can be transitive or intransitive, as seen in the table below.

Syntax 
Nearly all syntactic operations in the Malimiut dialect of Iñiupiaq—and Inuit languages and dialects in general—are carried out via morphological means."The language aligns to an ergative-absolutive case system, which is mainly shown through nominal case markings and verb agreement (see above).

The basic word order is subject-object-verb. However, word order is flexible and both subject and/or object can be omitted. There is a tendency for the subject of a transitive verb (marked by the ergative case) to precede the object of the clause (marked by the absolutive case). There is likewise a tendency for the subject of an intransitive verb (marked by the absolutive case) to precede the verb. The subject of an intransitive verb and the object of a clause (both marked by the absolutive case) are usually found right before the verb. However, "this is [all] merely a tendency."

Iñupiaq grammar also includes morphological passive, antipassive, causative and applicative.

Noun incorporation 
Noun incorporation is a common phenomenon in Malimiutun Iñupiaq. The first type of noun incorporation is lexical compounding. Within this subset of noun incorporation, the noun, which represents an instrument, location, or patient in relation to the verb, is attached to the front of the verb stem, creating a new intransitive verb. The second type is manipulation of case. It is argued whether this form of noun incorporation is present as noun incorporation in Iñupiaq, or "semantically transitive noun incorporation"—since with this kind of noun incorporation the verb remains transitive. The noun phrase subjects are incorporated not syntactically into the verb but rather as objects marked by the instrumental case. The third type of incorporation, manipulation of discourse structure, is supported by Mithun (1984) and argued against by Lanz (2010). See Lanz's paper for further discussion. The final type of incorporation is classificatory noun incorporation, whereby a "general [noun] is incorporated into the [verb], while a more specific [noun] narrows the scope". With this type of incorporation, the external noun can take on external modifiers and, like the other incorporations, the verb becomes intransitive. See Nominal Morphology (Instrumental Case, Usage of Instrumental table, row four) on this page for an example.

Switch-references 
Switch-references occur in dependent clauses only with third person subjects. The verb must be marked as reflexive if the third person subject of the dependent clause matches the subject of the main clause (more specifically matrix clause). Compare:

Text sample
This is a sample of the Iñupiaq language of the Kivalina variety from Kivalina Reader, published in 1975.

Aaŋŋaayiña aniñiqsuq Qikiqtami. Aasii iñuguġuni. Tikiġaġmi Kivaliñiġmiḷu. Tuvaaqatiniguni Aivayuamik. Qulit atautchimik qitunġivḷutik. Itchaksrat iñuuvlutiŋ. Iḷaŋat Qitunġaisa taamna Qiñuġana.

This is the English translation, from the same source:

Aaŋŋaayiña was born in Shishmaref. He grew up in Point Hope and Kivalina. He marries Aivayuaq. They had eleven children. Six of them are alive. One of the children is Qiñuġana.

Vocabulary comparison
The comparison of various vocabulary in four different dialects:

Notes

See also
Inuit languages
Inuit-Yupik-Unangan languages
Edna Ahgeak MacLean, a well-known Iñupiaq linguist
Iñupiat people

References

OBJ:object
INS:instrumental case

Print Resources: Existing Dictionaries, Grammar Books and Other 

 Barnum, Francis. Grammatical Fundamentals of the Innuit Language As Spoken by the Eskimo of the Western Coast of Alaska. Hildesheim: G. Olms, 1970.
 Blatchford, DJ. Just Like That!: Legends and Such, English to Iñupiaq Alphabet. Kasilof, AK: Just Like That!, 2003. 
 Bodfish, Emma, and David Baumgartner. Iñupiat Grammar. Utqiaġvigmi: Utqiaġvium minuaqtuġviata Iñupiatun savagvianni, 1979.
 Kaplan, Lawrence D. Phonological Issues in North Alaskan Iñupiaq. Alaska Native Language Center research papers, no. 6. Fairbanks, Alaska (Alaska Native Language Center, University of Alaska, Fairbanks 99701): Alaska Native Language Center, 1981.
 Kaplan, Lawrence. Iñupiaq Phrases and Conversations. Fairbanks, AK: Alaska Native Language Center, University of Alaska, 2000. 
 MacLean, Edna Ahgeak. Iñupiallu Tanņiḷḷu Uqaluņisa Iḷaņich = Abridged Iñupiaq and English Dictionary. Fairbanks, Alaska: Alaska Native Language Center, University of Alaska, 1980.
 Lanz, Linda A. A Grammar of Iñupiaq Morphosyntax. Houston, Texas: Rice University, 2010.
 MacLean, Edna Ahgeak. Beginning North Slope Iñupiaq Grammar. Fairbanks, Alaska: Alaska Native Language Center, University of Alaska, 1979.
 Seiler, Wolf A. Iñupiatun Eskimo Dictionary. Kotzebue, Alaska: NANA Regional Corporation, 2005.
 Seiler, Wolf. The Modalis Case in Iñupiat: (Eskimo of North West Alaska). Giessener Beiträge zur Sprachwissenschaft, Bd. 14. Grossen-Linden: Hoffmann, 1978. 
 Webster, Donald Humphry, and Wilfried Zibell. Iñupiat Eskimo Dictionary. 1970.

External links and language resources 
There are a number of online resources that can provide a sense of the language and information for second language learners. 
Atchagat Pronunciation Video by Aqukkasuk
Alaskool Iñupiaq Language Resources
Iñupiaq Language on Alaskanativelanguages.com by Iyaġak
Animal Names in Brevig Mission Dialect
Atchagat App by Grant and Reid Magdanz—Allows you to text using Iñupiaq characters. (For all Alaska Native languages, including Iñupiaq, see updated Chert app by the same developers.) 
Dictionary of Iñupiaq, 1970 University of Fairbanks PDF by Webster
Endangered Alaskan Language Goes Digital from National Public Radio
Iñupiaq Handbook for Teachers (A story of the Iñupiaq language and further resources): 
University of Alaska Fairbanks Iñupiat Language Community Site
North Slope Grammar Second Year by Dr. Edna MacLean PDF
Online Iñupiaq morphological analyser
Storybook—The Teller Reader, A Collection of Stories in the Brevig Mission Dialect --
Storybook—Quliaqtuat Mumiaksrat by Alaska Native Language Program, UAF and Dr. Edna MacLean
 The dialects of Iñupiaq- From Languagegeek.com, includes Northern Alaskan Consonants (US alphabet), Northern Alaskan Vowels, Seward Peninsula Consonants, Seward Peninsula Vowels
 InupiaqWords YouTube account
 https://scholarship.rice.edu/bitstream/handle/1911/62097/3421210.PDF?sequence=1 — Linda A. Lanz's Grammar of Iñupiaq (Malimiutun) Morphosyntax. The majority of grammar introduced on this Wikipedia page is cited from this grammar. Lanz's explanations are very detailed and thorough—a great source for gaining a more in-depth understanding of Iñupiaq grammar.

Agglutinative languages
Inupiat language
Indigenous languages of Alaska
Languages of Russia
Indigenous languages of the North American Arctic
Official languages of Alaska